Mikhail Sergeyevich Solomentsev (– 15 February 2008) was a high-ranking Soviet politician and statesman.

Early life 
He was born near Yelets and graduated from the Leningrad Technological Institute in 1940.

Career
Solomentsev was a leading Communist Party functionary in Kazakhstan during 1962–1964 and was in charge of the Rostov-on-Don obkom from 1964–1966. He served as a secretary of the Central Committee of the Communist Party of the Soviet Union during the years 1966–1971.  Solomontsev was Chairman of the Council of Ministers of the Russian RSFR starting from 1971 and ending in 1983. He sat in the Politburo from 1983 until he was sacked by Mikhail Gorbachev in 1988. In October 1987 he led a Commission of the Politburo to look into the “purge” trials of the 1930s. The commission also included KGB Chief Viktor Chebrikov and Alexander Yakovlev. Yakovlev subsequently took over the chairmanship of the Commission.

Decorations and awards
 Twice Hero of Socialist Labour (1973 and 1983)
 Four Orders of Lenin
 Two Order of the Red Banner of Labour
 Order of the Red Star

References

Martin McCauley, Who's Who in Russia Since 1900, Routledge, 1997, ; pp. 194–195

1913 births
2008 deaths
People from Yeletsky District
Heads of government of the Russian Soviet Federative Socialist Republic
Central Committee of the Communist Party of the Soviet Union members
Politburo of the Central Committee of the Communist Party of the Soviet Union members
Heroes of Socialist Labour
Recipients of the Order of Lenin
Saint Petersburg State Institute of Technology alumni